The Savannas languages, also known as Gur–Adamawa or Adamawa–Gur, is a branch of the Niger–Congo languages that includes Greenberg's Gur and Adamawa–Ubangui families.

History of classification
The Gur–Adamawa link was demonstrated in Kleinewillinghöfer (1996) and has been accepted as established by later researchers, who have gone further in noting that the Adamawa and Gur languages themselves do not form coherent groups and are not necessarily more closely related internally than they are to each other.

Bennett (1983) had also mentioned a North Central Niger-Congo branch consisting of Gurunsi, "Ubangian", and Trans-Benue groups, with the Trans-Benue group consisting of the Burak-Jen (i.e., Bikwin-Jen), Yungur (i.e., Bena-Mboi), and Tula-Longuda subgroups.

There are several clusters of Adamawa languages; among the Gur languages, only the core of that proposal (Central Gur) has been retained, though it is possible that some of the 'peripheral' languages may turn out to be related to each other. Kleinewillinghöfer et al. (2012) note that a reconstruction of proto-Central Gur noun classes needs to include several Adamawa families.

Senufo (ex-Gur) and Fali (ex-Adamawa) are excluded from Savannas, as they appear to be some of the more divergent branches of Niger–Congo.

Dimmendaal (2008) excludes the Ubangian family from Niger–Congo altogether, stating that it "probably constitutes an independent language family that cannot or can no longer be shown to be related to Niger–Congo (or any other family)," though the Ubangian languages are themselves not a valid group, and the Gbaya branch may turn out to be related to Gur.

Apart from such exceptions, Dimmendaal notes that the Savanna languages "can be shown to be genetically related beyond any reasonable doubt. The evidence is not only lexical in nature, it is based primarily on a range of cognate grammatical morphemes."

Roger Blench (2012) considers Gur-Adamawa to be a language continuum (linkage) rather than an actual coherent branch.

Kleinewillinghöfer (2014) notes that many "Adamawa" languages in fact share more similarities with various (Central) Gur languages than with other Adamawa languages, and proposes that early Gur-Adamawa speakers had cultivated guinea corn and millet in a wooded savanna environment.

Languages
The Savannas languages, with an agnostic approach to internal classification, are as follows:

 Savannas 
 (Central) Gur
 Kulango (a.k.a. "Kulango–Lorhon": ex-Gur)
 Bariba (a.k.a. "Baatonũ": ex-Gur)
 Vyemo (ex-Gur)
 Tiefo (ex-Gur)
 Wara–Natyoro (ex-Gur)
 Tusya (a.k.a. "Win": ex-Gur)
 Chamba–Mumuye a.k.a. Leko–Nimbari (ex-Adamawa: G2, G4, G5, G12)
 Mbum–Day (ex-Adamawa: G6, G13, G14, & Day)
 Bambukic (ex-Adamawa: G7, G9, G10)
 Waja–Kam (ex-Adamawa: G1, G8)
 ? Baa (a.k.a. "Kwa")
  Gbaya (ex-Ubangian)
 ? Ubangian
 ? Zande (ex-Ubangian)

The moribund Oblo language was left unclassified within Adamawa, and has not been addressed in Savannas.

Kleinewillinghöfer et al. (2012) note that the reconstruction of the noun-class system indicates that Waja ('Tula–Waja') and Leko–Nimbari ('Sama–Duru') (and possibly other Adamawa groups) belong with Central Gur, and that the noun-class system they reconstruct for these languages is akin to those of Bantu, Senufo, Tiefo, Vyemo, Tusya, and "Samu".

Güldemann (2018)
Güldemann (2018) recognises the following coherent "genealogical units" (8 Gur, 14 Adamawa, and 7 Ubangi) but is agnostic about their positions within Niger-Congo.

Gur area
(Central) Gur
Kulangoic
Miyobe
Tiefo
Viemo
Tusian
Samuic
Senufo

Adamawa area
Tula-Waja
Longuda
Bena-Mboi
Bikwin-Jen
Samba-Duru
Mumuyic
Maya (Yendangic)
Kebi-Benue (Mbumic)
Kimic
Buaic
Day
Baa = Kwa
Nyingwom = Kam
Fali

Ubangi area
Gbayaic
Zandic
Mbaic
Mundu-Baka
Ngbandic
Bandaic
Ndogoic

Branches and locations (Nigeria)
Below is a list of major Savannas (Adamawa) branches and their primary locations (centres of diversity) within Nigeria based on Blench (2019).

References

External links
 Blench (2004) List of Adamawa languages
 Rapid appraisal and lexicostatistical analysis surveys of Dama, Mono, Pam, Ndai and Oblo (PDF) by Michael & Charlene Ayotte, 2002. SIL Electronic Survey Reports SILESR 2002-048.
 Vocabulaires comparés des instruments aratoires dans le Nord-Cameroun, Tourneaux
 Adamawa-Gur languages

Volta–Congo languages
Adamawa languages
Gur languages